Trachylepis gravenhorstii, also known commonly as Gravenhorst's mabuya, is a species of skink, a lizard in the family Scincidae. The species is endemic to Madagascar.

Etymology
The specific name, gravenhorstii, is in honor of German zoologist Johann Ludwig Christian Gravenhorst.

Habitat
The preferred natural habitats of T. gravenhorstii are rocky areas, grassland, shrubland, and forest.

Description

Reproduction
T. gravenhorstii is oviparous.

References

Further reading
Bauer AM (2003). "On the identity of Lacerta punctata Linnaeus 1758, the type species of the genus Euprepis Fitzinger 1830, and the generic assignment of Afro-Malagasy skinks". African Journal of Herpetology 52 (1): 1–7. (Trachylepis gravenhorstii, new combination).
Duméril AMC, Bibron G (1839). Erpétologie générale ou Histoire naturelle complète des Reptiles. Tome cinquième [Volume 5]. Paris: Roret. viii + 854 pp. (Euprepes gravenhorstii, new species, p. 686). (in French).
Glaw F, Vences M (2006). A Field Guide to the Amphibians and Reptiles of Madagascar, Third Edition. Cologne, Germany: Vences & Glaw Verlag. 496 pp. .
Vences M, Lima A, Miralles A, Glaw F (2014). "DNA barcoding assessment of genetic variation in two widespread skinks from Madagascar, Trachylepis elegans and T. gravenhorstii (Squamata: Scincidae)". Zootaxa 3755: 477–484.

Trachylepis
Reptiles described in 1839
Taxa named by André Marie Constant Duméril
Taxa named by Gabriel Bibron